Henry Edson Quinteros Sánchez (born 19 October 1977 in Lima) is a retired football midfielder from Peru. He is also the older brother of Ronald Quinteros.

Club career
Quinteros was born in Lima, the son of Julio Ignacio Quinteros Surco († 2011).

Nicknamed El Pato (The Duck) and/or Kwinto Quinteros spent his youth career with top Peruvian side Alianza Lima.
He started his professional career playing for Segunda División Peruana team Bella Esperanza in the 1997 season. Quinteros returned to Alianza the following season and made his Torneo Descentralizado debut in the 1998 season.
He remained at Alianza for five years being an important player for the club. In 2003, he moved to rival club Sporting Cristal where he continued to be one of the top players in Peru.

In 2006, he left Peru and joined Polish club Lech Poznań where he
played in central midfield, becoming a fan favourite in Poland. He left Lech Poznań in August 2008 due to personal problems and returned to his original club Alianza Lima.

He retired after spending 2014 playing for León de Huánuco in the Torneo Descentralizado.

International career
He made his debut for the national team on 16 February 2000.

References

External links
 
 

1977 births
Living people
Footballers from Lima
Association football midfielders
Peruvian footballers
Peru international footballers
C.D. Bella Esperanza footballers
Club Alianza Lima footballers
Sporting Cristal footballers
Lech Poznań players
León de Huánuco footballers
Peruvian Segunda División players
Peruvian Primera División players
Ekstraklasa players
Peruvian expatriate footballers
Peruvian expatriate sportspeople in Poland
Expatriate footballers in Poland
2000 CONCACAF Gold Cup players